James Edward Phipps Snedker (March 11, 1911March 31, 1981) was an English-born farmer, business owner and political figure in Saskatchewan, Canada. He represented Saltcoats in the Legislative Assembly of Saskatchewan from 1960 to 1971 as a Liberal.

He came to Saskatchewan with his family at a young age but returned to England for his education. In the late 1920s, he returned to Saskatchewan and settled on a farm near Saltcoats. Snedker also owned the Saltcoats Seed Company. He was a member of the local school board and of hospital boards in the area. Snedker was also a judge for the Canadian Trotting Association. He served as speaker for the Saskatchewan assembly from 1965 to 1971. Snedker was defeated when he ran for reelection in 1971.

References 
 
Saskatchewan Archives Board – Saskatchewan Election Results By Electoral Division

1911 births
1981 deaths
People from Northamptonshire (before 1974)
British emigrants to Canada
People from Saltcoats, Saskatchewan
Speakers of the Legislative Assembly of Saskatchewan
Saskatchewan Liberal Party MLAs